The Water-Carrier Is Dead (transliterated as Al-saqqa mat) is an Egyptian-Tunisian film released on November 20, 1977. The film is directed by Salah Abu Seif and produced by Youssef Chahine, features a screenplay by Mohsen Zayed based on a short story by Yusuf Sibai, and stars Ezzat El Alaili, Farid Shawqi, Shwikar, Amina Rizk, Taheyya Kariokka, and Nahid Jabr. The film won the award  for the Best Egyotian film of the year in 1977. It was later listed at the Dubai film festival among the best 100 Arab films of all time.

Plot
In the Cairo neighborhood around Al-Hussein Mosque (called Husseiniyah) around 1921, Shusha, a watercarrier, is very afraid of death since he has lost all his loved ones to it. He tries to foster a close relationship between his surviving son and a woman named Amna, who reminds Shusha of his late wife. He has also always dreamed of becoming the director of the pumping station and tries to get his son to succeed at this where he failed. Shusha meets and befriends Shehata Effendi, who he learns is a teaching assistant, but Shehata too dies, and Shusha has a nervous breakdown while helping bury the man.

Cast
 Farid Shawqi (Shehata Effendi, a teaching assistant)
 Ezzat El Alaili (Shusha, the watercarrier)
 Shwikar (Aziza Nofal)
 Amina Rizk (Amna’s mother)
 Taheyya Kariokka (Professor Zamzam)
 Nahid Jabr (Amna)
 Sharif Salah El-Din (Sayed, a boy)
 Hassan Hussein (Sheikh Syed)
 Ibrahim Kadri (pharmacist)
 Mohamed Farid (Jad)
 Mohamed Abo Hashish (Ibrahim Khosht, a welder)
 Belqis (Zakia bint al-Muallem)
 Aziza Mohammed
 Abdulaziz Issa (water company employee)
 Sabry Rasian
 Muhammad Naeem
 Ibrahim Zago (Dongle)
 Ali al-Ma’awon (Sharaf al-Dabbah)
 Naim Issa (other teaching assistant)
 Michel Gaballah (Fathi, a young coffee gofer)
 Bilqis Sharia (Zakia)

Production
Yusuf al-Sibai’s original novel centered on the philosophy of life and death, pessimism and optimism. Published in 1952 by the University Publishing House, it was one director Salah Abu Seif tried repeatedly to film in the early 1970’s despite producers’ reluctant to underwrite a story so focused on death. Youssef Chahine found the idea compelling and came around to it, however, and decided to produce it jointly with the Tunisian company SATPC ( or “Tunisian Film Production and Distribution Company”) in 1977. The screenplay was co-written by Mohsen Zayed and Abu Seif.

Filming
The filmmakers settled on Mohamed Sabo, best-known as a still photographer, as cinematographer despite his lack of film experience. He shot the footage over the course of a mere four weeks.

Reception
The film was showcased at the 36th Venice International Film Festival in 1979.

References

External links
 El Cinema page
 
 El Film page
 Letterboxd page
 Kinopoisk page

Egyptian drama films
1977 films
1970s Arabic-language films
Films directed by Youssef Chahine
Films directed by Salah Abu Seif